Beth is a given name that is usually a shortened form (hypocorism) of Elizabeth, Elsbeth (Scottish version of Elizabeth), Bethany or Bethan

People
Beth (singer) (b. 1981), Spanish singer
Beth Allen (b. 1984), New Zealand actress
Beth Amsel, American folk singer
Beth Anders (b. 1951), American field hockey player and coach
Beth Anderson (composer) (b. 1950), American composer
Beth Anderson (b. 1954), American singer
Beth Bauer (b. 1980), American professional golfer
Beth Beglin (b. 1957), American field hockey player
Beth Behrs (b. 1985), American actress
Beth Barr (b. 1971), American swimmer
Beth Bonner (1952–1998), American long-distance runner
BethAnn Bonner (b. 1982), American actress
Beth Botsford (b. 1981), American swimmer
Beth Broderick (b. 1959), American actress
Beth Buchanan (b. 1952), Australian actress
Beth Cahill (b. 1963), American television actress
Beth Carey (b. 1990), Australian volleyball player
Beth Carvalho (1946–2019), Brazilian singer and composer
 Beth Chapman (bounty hunter), American bounty hunter and reality star
 Beth Chapman (politician), American politician from Alabama
Beth Chatto (1923–2018), British garden designer
Beth Chamberlin (b. 1963), American actress
Beth Clayton, American opera singer
Beth Cordingly (b. 1977), English actress
Beth Couture (b. 1962), American women's basketball coach
Beth Daniel (b. 1956), American golfer
Beth Denisch (b. 1958), American composer
Beth Ditto (b. 1981), American singer-songwriter
Beth Doherty, Irish climate activist
Beth Dunkenberger (b. 1966), American women's basketball coach
Beth Edmonds (b. 1950), American politician
Beth Ehlers (b. 1968), American politician
Beth Fowler (b. 1940), American actress and singer
Beth Gaines (b. 1959), American politician
Beth Grant (b. 1949), American actress
Beth Gibbons (b. 1965), English singer-songwriter
Beth Goddard (b. 1969), British actress
Beth Goobie (b. 1959), Canadian poet and writer
Beth Gylys (b. 1964), American poet and professor of English and Creative Writing
Beth Hart (b. 1972), American singer
Beth Heiden (b. 1959), American athlete
Beth Henley (b. 1952), American actress
Beth Herr (b. 1964), American tennis player
Beth Holloway (b. 1961), American speech pathologist
Beth Howland (1939–2015), American actress
Beth Iskiw (b. 1979), Canadian curler
Beth Jeans Houghton (b. 1990), English singer-songwriter
 Beth Johnson (American politician) (1909–1973), member of the Florida House of Representatives and the Florida Senate
 Beth Johnson (mayor), mayor of Delta, British Columbia, Canada
Beth Karas (b. 1961), American television reporter
Beth Kerttula (b. 1956), American politician
Beth Kephart, American author
Beth Kingston (b. 1986), English actress
Beth Kobliner (b. 1965), American journalist
Beth Krom (b. 1958), American politician
Beth Krommes (b. 1956), American illustrator
Beth Krush (1918–2009), American illustrator
Beth Lapides, American entertainer
Beth Leavel (b. 1955), American stage actress
Beth Levin (linguist) (b. 1955), American linguist
Beth Levin (musician) (b. 1950), American classical pianist
Beth Levine (fashion designer) (1914–2006), American fashion designer
Beth Liebling (b. 1967), American musician
Beth Lisick (b. 1968), American writer
Beth Littleford (b. 1968), American actress
Beth Mead (b. 1995), English association footballer
Beth Mitchell (1972-1998), American shag dancer and schoolteacher
Beth Orton (b. 1970), English singer-songwriter
Beth Phoenix (b. 1980), Polish American professional wrestler and former WWE Diva
Beth Wood (b. 1954), U.S. state auditor
Beth Zanders (née Baker, 1913–2009), New Zealand artist

Characters
Beth, a character in the Canadian teen drama television series Madison
Beth, a character in the 2005 American romantic comedy movie The 40-Year-Old Virgin
Beth, a character played by Jennifer Aniston in the 2009 American romantic comedy-drama movie He's Just Not That Into You
Beth, in the animated series Total Drama
Beth Bailey, in TV series Spooks
Beth Brennan, in TV series Neighbours
Beth Clement, in TV series Hollyoaks
Beth Dutton, a character in Yellowstone.
Beth Green, in TV series The Bill
Beth Greene, in TV series The Walking Dead
Beth Gordon, a character from the Ghost Whisperer
Beth Hunter, in TV series Home and Away
Beth Jordache, in TV series Brookside
Elizabeth "Beth" March, in Louisa May Alcott's novel Little Women
Elizabeth "Beth" Childs, in the TV series Orphan Black
Beverly Elizabeth "Beth" Nicholls in the TV series No Angels
Elizabeth "Beth" Harmon in the novel and TV miniseries The Queen's Gambit
Beth Stanley, a character in the 1998 American science-fiction disaster movie Deep Impact
Beth Ryan, a character in the 1987 movie Throw Momma from the Train
Beth Smith (née Sanchez), in the Adult Swim cartoon Rick and Morty
Beth Tezuka, a character in Bravest Warriors
Beth Trevino, a character in the 1993 American action film Falling Down

See also
Bet (disambiguation)
Beth (disambiguation)
Bethany (disambiguation)
Elizabeth (disambiguation)

Feminine given names
Hypocorisms